John Cosgrove may refer to:

John Cosgrove (Missouri politician) (1839–1925), U.S. Representative from Missouri
John Cosgrove (Virginia politician) (born 1954), American politician and member of the Senate of Virginia
John F. Cosgrove (1949–2006), Florida legislator
John Cosgrove (actor) (1867–1925), Australian actor, writer and director
John M. G. Cosgrove (born 1949), Garda Síochána and recipient of the Scott Medal

See also
Jack Cosgrove (disambiguation)